Ellingsen is a surname. Notable people with the surname include:

Åge Ellingsen (born 1962), former Norwegian ice hockey defenceman
Audun Ellingsen (born 1979), Norwegian jazz musician (Upright bass)
Beate Ellingsen (born 1950), Norwegian interior designer and furniture designer
Bruce Ellingsen (born 1949), American former professional baseball player
Eivind Ellingsen, Norwegian handball player
Emma Ellingsen (born 2001), Norwegian model and internet personality
Gisle Ellingsen (born 1965), former Norwegian high jumper
Håkon Ellingsen (1894–1971), Norwegian rower who competed in the 1920 Summer Olympics
Helge Ellingsen Waagaard (1781–1817), Norwegian farmer and non-commissioned military officer
Jan Arild Ellingsen (born 1958), Norwegian politician for the Progress Party
Lena Kristin Ellingsen (born 1980), actress from Saltdal, Norway
María Ellingsen (born 1964), Icelandic actress starring in movies
Øyvind Ellingsen (born 1975), Norwegian Professor of Cellular Cardiology
Percy Ellingsen (1895–1947), Australian rules footballer
Svein Ellingsen (1929–2020), Norwegian visual artist and hymnist
Tore Ellingsen (born 1962), Norwegian economist active in Sweden

See also
Elingen
Elling
Ellinge
Ellingen